Yumrutaş can refer to:

 Yumrutaş, Acıpayam
 Yumrutaş, Ağlasun
 Yumrutaş, Mengen